John Dawson, 2nd Earl of Portarlington (26February 178128December 1845) was a British Army officer who fought in the Napoleonic Wars.

Family
He was the son of John Dawson, 1st Earl of Portarlington (1744–1798) who had been created Earl of Portarlington in 1785. His mother was Lady Caroline Stuart (before 1763–1813) the fifth daughter of John Stuart, 3rd Earl of Bute.

Career
He began his career as an ensign in the 20th Foot in March 1798 and was promoted to Lieutenant in December of the same year. On 24March 1800 he was promoted to captain in the 46th Foot before transferring to the 23rd Light Dragoons. After a spell as a major in the 4th Garrison Battalion and as a lieutenant colonel in the 10th Foot he returned to the 23rd Dragoons on 6April 1809.
Dawson served during the Peninsular Campaign and at the Battle of Talavera.

Waterloo Campaign
After commanding his regiment at the Battle of Quatre Bras on 16–17 June 1815, Dawson failed to appear at the head of his dragoons on the morning the Battle of Waterloo a day later. The reason for his non-appearance is unknown but it has been speculated that he was advised not to go by a surgeon, that "he had betaken himself that same evening to Brussels or elsewhere." or through "the negligence of a servant, who from oversleeping himself was unable to call his master sufficiently early to be in readiness to discharge the proper duties of his military rank." Although he joined the 18th Hussars towards the end of the battle and took part in Major General Sir Hussey Vivian's decisive charge, he resigned from the army shortly afterwards.

Later career
Owing to his friendship with "Prinnie", the Prince Regent, later King George IV, he was offered a cornetcy in the 23rd Dragoons, which he accepted and became and aide-de-camp to the king with the automatic rank of colonel.

Death
Dawson died at his residence in the Kennington Road in Lambeth, London, on 28December 1845. He is deposited in Catacomb B in Kensal Green Cemetery, London.

As he was unmarried and had no issue, the earldom passed to his nephew Henry Dawson-Damer, 3rd Earl of Portarlington (1822–1889).

References

Bibliography

 

1781 births
1845 deaths
Earls of Portarlington
Dawson-Damer family
British Army personnel of the Peninsular War
48th Regiment of Foot officers
Royal Lincolnshire Regiment officers
Recipients of the Waterloo Medal
Burials at Kensal Green Cemetery